Fallah Johnson (born October 26, 1976 in Monrovia) is a Liberian former footballer and former member of the Liberia national football team.

References

External links 
 

1976 births
Living people
Association football defenders
Liberian footballers
Liberian expatriate footballers
1996 African Cup of Nations players
2002 African Cup of Nations players
Liberian expatriate sportspeople in Indonesia
Expatriate footballers in Indonesia
Persik Kediri players
Sportspeople from Monrovia
Liberia international footballers